Psomus is a genus of true weevils in the beetle family Curculionidae. There are about five described species in Psomus.

Species
These five species belong to the genus Psomus:
 Psomus armatus (Dietz, 1891) i b
 Psomus caseyi Champion, 1906 c
 Psomus politus Casey, 1892 c
 Psomus quadrinotatus Champion, 1906 c
 Psomus violaceus Champion, 1906 c
Data sources: i = ITIS, c = Catalogue of Life, g = GBIF, b = Bugguide.net

References

Further reading

 
 
 

Curculionidae
Articles created by Qbugbot